Berkeley Bowl is an independent  grocery store in Berkeley, California. Founded by Glenn and Diane Yasuda, it sells organic and natural products and is known for its extensive produce section. In 2008, the Los Angeles Times wrote that it was "[Berkeley]'s most popular grocery store" and "one of the nation's most renowned retailers of exotic fruits and vegetables." It has two locations in the city.

The business name is a reference to the former bowling alley that became the store's first location.

History
In 1977, Glenn and Diane Yasuda opened a small neighborhood market in a converted building that formerly housed a bowling alley at 2777 Shattuck Avenue. By the late 1990s, it had outgrown the building, and in 1999 moved to a renovated Safeway at 2020 Oregon Street. Labor organizers pushed to unionize the store's 250 employees in 2003, but after a series of disputes, the National Labor Relations Board accused the company of "pervasive and serious" labor issues that prevented a fair election. The company reached a settlement recognizing the United Food and Commercial Workers as representatives of Berkeley Bowl workers, and paying but not reinstating two employees who claimed that they were unfairly fired. A second location, Berkeley Bowl West, opened in 2009. The union was decertified after an employee vote in 2010.

References

External links

Retail companies established in 1977
1977 establishments in California
Food and drink in the San Francisco Bay Area
Companies based in Berkeley, California
Food retailers of the United States
Supermarkets based in California